The 2008-09 season saw Glasgow Warriors compete in the competitions: the Magners Celtic League and the European Champions Cup, the Heineken Cup.

Season Overview

Team

Coaches

Squad

Academy players

  Pat MacArthur - Hooker
  Joe Stafford - Prop
  Richie Gray - Lock
  Rob Harley - Lock
  Neale Patrick - Lock
  Chris Fusaro - Flanker

  Peter Jericevich - Scrum-half
  Jamie Hunter - Fly-half
  Alex Dunbar - Centre
  Scott Forrest - Centre
  Steven Wilson - Centre
  Chris Kinloch - Wing
  Grant Anderson - Full Back
  Peter Horne - Full Back

Back up players

Other players used by Glasgow Warriors over the course of the season.

  Greg Francis (Glasgow Hawks) - Flanker
  Dave Whiteford (Melrose) - Centre

Player statistics

During the 2008–09 season, Glasgow have used 36 different players in competitive games. The table below shows the number of appearances and points scored by each player.

Staff movements

Coaches

Personnel In

Personnel Out

Player movements

Academy promotions

  Chris Kinloch
  Richie Gray
  Ruaridh Jackson
  Calum Forrester

Player transfers

In

Out

Competitions

Pre-season and friendlies

Match 1

Castres: 
Replacements:

Glasgow Warriors: Colin Shaw; Lome Fa'atau, Hefin O'Hare, Daryl Gibson, Chris Kinloch (Edinburgh Accies); Colin Gregor, Sam Pinder;Justin Va'a, Eric Milligan, Ed Kalman, Al Kellock [Capt], Opeta Palepoi, Dan Turner, Calum Forrester, Richie VernonReplacements (all used): Kevin Tkachuk, Pat MacArthur (Ayr), Jon Welsh, Greg Francis (Glasgow Hawks), Johnnie Beattie, Mark McMillan,Ruaridh Jackson, Andrew Henderson, Max Evans, David Whiteford (Melrose)

Match 2

Beziers: 
Replacements

Glasgow Warriors: Colin Shaw; Thom Evans, Hefin O'Hare, Andy Henderson, Chris Kinloch; Colin Gregor, Mark McMillan; Kevin Tkachuk, Dougie Hall, Moray Low, Opeta Palepoi, Alastair Kellock (Captain), Dan Turner, Calum Forrester, Richie Vernon
Replacements (all used): Eric Milligan, Pat Macarthur, Jon Welsh, Justin Va'a, Johnnie Beattie, Kelly Brown, Sam Pinder, Ruaridh Jackson, Max Evans, Lome Fa'atau, David Whiteford

Winning both matches against the French opposition meant that Glasgow Warriors won the 2008 XV Challenge Vacquerin trophy.

Match 3

Glasgow Warriors: R Jackson; L Fa'atau, M Evans, A Henderson, T Evans; D Parks, M McMillan; E Kalman, D Hall, M Low, O Palepoi, D Turner, K Brown, R Vernon, J Barclay
Replacements: A Kellock for Palepoi 25mins, J Beattie for Vernon 40, E Milligan for Hall, C Gregor for McMillan, both 52, G Strain for Kalman 58, D Gibson for Henderson, C Forrester for Brown, R Gray for Turner, H O'Hare for Fa'atau, McMillan for Parks, all 64, Vernon for Barclay 71, Kalman for Low 75

Bristol: L Arscott; T Arscott, J Fatialofa, K Maggs, A Elliot; A Jarvis, G Beveridge; A Clarke, D Blaney, J Hobson, R Winters, R Sidoli, A Blowers, D Ward-Smith, J El-Abd
Replacements: N Budgett for Winters, M Sambucetti for Sidol, R Pennycook for Blowers, all 63, V Lilo for Fatialofa 65

Match 4

Gloucester: O Morgan; I Balshaw, M Tindall (capt), A Allen, L Vainikolo, R Lamb, G Cooper; N Wood, A Titterrell, C Nieto, W James, A Brown, P Buxton, L Narraway, Andy Hazell
Replacements: O Azam, D Young, M Bortolami, A Strokosch, R Lawson, W Walker, M Watkins, J Simpson-Daniel

Glasgow Warriors: Kevin Tkachuk, Dougie Hall, Moray Low, Alastair Kellock, Dan Turner, Kelly Brown, John Barclay, Richie Vernon,Mark McMillan, Dan Parks, Thom Evans, Graeme Morrison, Max Evans, Lome Fa'atau, Bernardo Stortoni
Replacements: Eric Milligan, Justin Va'a, Ed Kalman, Tim Barker, Andrew Henderson, Ruaridh Jackson, Steve Swindall, Calum Forrester,Colin Gregor, Hefin O'Hare

European Champions Cup

Pool 5

Results

Round 1

Round 2

Round 3

Round 4

Round 5

Round 6

Magners Celtic League

League table

Results

The all-Welsh fixtures were played mid-week to allow their teams to compete in the Anglo-Welsh Cup.

Round 1

Round 2

Round 3

Round 4

Round 5

Round 6

Round 7

Round 8: 1872 Cup (1st Leg)

Round 9: 1872 Cup (2nd Leg)

Edinburgh Rugby won the 1872 Cup with an aggregate score of 59 - 31.

Round 10

Round 11

Round 12

Round 13

Round 14

Round 15

Round 16

Round 17

Round 18

Competitive debuts this season

A player's nationality shown is taken from the nationality at the highest honour for the national side obtained; or if never capped internationally their place of birth. Senior caps take precedence over junior caps or place of birth; junior caps take precedence over place of birth. A player's nationality at debut may be different from the nationality shown. Combination sides like the British and Irish Lions or Pacific Islanders are not national sides, or nationalities.

Players in BOLD font have been capped by their senior international XV side as nationality shown.

Players in Italic font have capped either by their international 7s side; or by the international XV 'A' side as nationality shown.

Players in normal font have not been capped at senior level.

A position in parentheses indicates that the player debuted as a substitute. A player may have made a prior debut for Glasgow Warriors in a non-competitive match, 'A' match or 7s match; these matches are not listed.

Tournaments where competitive debut made:

Crosshatching indicates a jointly hosted match.

Sponsorship

Official Kit Supplier

Canterbury - Official Kit Supplier

References

2008-09
2008–09 in Scottish rugby union
2008–09 Celtic League by team
2008–09 Heineken Cup by team